Bianca Jane Netzler (born 14 July 1974, in New Zealand) is a New Zealand road cyclist who represented Samoa. 

She competed at the 2000 Summer Olympics in the women's road race. In 1998, she competed in the 1998 Commonwealth Games in Kuala Lumpur and won silver in the time trial at the world B-grade championships in South America. She also raced for New Zealand at the 1993 Junior World Championships. In 1998, she raced for two teams: APSTT Moselle Champion and Opstalan.

References

External links
 
 profile at sports-reference.com

Samoan female cyclists
Cyclists at the 2000 Summer Olympics
Olympic cyclists of Samoa
Living people
1974 births
New Zealand female cyclists